Charles O'Sullivan (22 August 1858, Ballyfinnane – 29 January 1927, Killarney) was an Irish Roman Catholic bishop.

O'Sullivan was educated at St Patrick's College, Maynooth and ordained in 1884. He received the degree of Doctor of Divinity (DD). He was Bishop of Ardfert and Aghadoe from 1917 until his death.

References

1858 births
1927 deaths
20th-century Roman Catholic bishops in Ireland
Roman Catholic Bishops of Ardfert and Agahdoe
Alumni of St Patrick's College, Maynooth
Clergy from County Kerry